Juan Almeida Bosque (February 17, 1927 – September 11, 2009) was a Cuban politician and one of the original commanders of the insurgent forces in the Cuban Revolution. After the rebels took power in 1959, he was a prominent figure in the Communist Party of Cuba. At the time of his death, he was a Vice-President of the Cuban Council of State and was its third ranking member. He received several decorations, and national and international awards, including the title of "Hero of the Republic of Cuba" and the Order of Máximo Gómez.

Early life and revolution
Almeida was born in Havana. He left school at the age of eleven and became a bricklayer. He was born in a poor family and during part of his youth he was a street vendor of marijuana and a pickpocket for which he was arrested by the police in Havana, and he had the nickname “Caballo Blanco” (White Horse). He became close friend of the revolutionary Fidel Castro and in March 1953 joined the anti-Batista movement. On July 26, 1953 he joined Fidel and his brother Raúl Castro in the attack on the Moncada Barracks in Santiago de Cuba. He was arrested and imprisoned with the Castro brothers in the Isle of Pines Prison. During the amnesty of May 15, 1955, he was released and transferred to Mexico.

Almeida returned to Cuba with the Castro brothers, Che Guevara and 78 other revolutionaries on the Granma expedition and was one of just 12 who survived the initial landing. Almeida is often credited with shouting "No one here gives up!" (alternatively "here, nobody surrenders") to Guevara, which would become a slogan of the Cuban revolution, although the words were actually spoken by Camilo Cienfuegos. Almeida was also reputed to be a good marksman. Following the landing, Almeida continued to fight Fulgencio Batista's government forces in the guerilla war in the Sierra Maestra mountain range. In 1958, he was promoted to Commander and head of the Santiago Column of the Revolutionary Army. During the revolution, as a black man in a prominent position, he served as a symbol for Afro-Cubans of the rebellion's break with Cuba's discriminatory past.

Post-revolution
After the success of the Cuban revolution in January 1959, Almeida commanded large parts of the Revolutionary Armed Forces of Cuba. As a major during the Bay of Pigs Invasion in April 1961, he headed of the Central Army with headquarters in Santa Clara, Cuba. Later he was promoted to general, chosen as a member of the central committee and political bureau, and held a number of other government positions.

He was honoured with the title of Commander of the Revolution and at the time of his death was one of just three living holders of that title, the others being Guillermo García and Ramiro Valdés.

In 1998, Fidel Castro named Almeida a "Hero of the Republic of Cuba". Almeida also headed the National Association of Veterans and Combatants of the Revolution. He authored several books, including the popular trilogy Military prison, Exile and  Disembarkation. He was also a songwriter and one of his songs, "Dame un traguito" (English: "Give me a Sip"), was popular in Cuba for several years.

Death
Almeida died of a heart attack on September 11, 2009. On September 13, a memorial ceremony was held in the Plaza de la Revolución in Havana and several others were held across Cuba. A national day of mourning was declared, with flags flown at half mast. Fidel Castro, who had not been seen in public since resigning as president in 2008, sent a wreath that was placed alongside one from Raúl Castro. Other senior government and Communist Party members also attended.

Internationally, there were several tributes. The President of Vietnam, Nguyễn Minh Triết, sent a message describing Almeida as a great friend of the Vietnamese people who contributed to the ties of solidarity between the two nations. The Secretary of the Colombian Communist Party expressed his condolences. In Moscow, a musical homage was staged and a collection of Almeida's songs entitled "El Bolero Cubano" (Cuban Ballads) was scheduled for release for the first time in Russian.

Almeida did not want his body to lie in state. He was given a military funeral at a mausoleum in the mountains near Santiago de Cuba, an area in which he had fought during the revolution.

In 2013, a mural relief portrait of Almeida was installed on the façade of the Teatro Heredia in Santiago de Cuba. The sculpture was designed by Enrique Ávila González, creator of the portraits of Che Guevara and Camilo Cienfuegos located in the Plaza de la Revolución in Havana, and includes the quotation “Aqui no se rinde nadie” (Here no one gives up).

A book published in 2005 alleged that the Kennedy administration had selected Almeida for a key role in a plot run called AMWORLD or C-Day to remove Castro and set to launch on December 1, 1963. It contended the plot was managed by Robert F. Kennedy and aborted by John F. Kennedy's assassination in November 1963.

References

Sources
Castro, Fidel, with Ramonet, Ignacio. 2007. My Life 
Fernandez, Jose Ramon. 2001. Playa Giron/Bay of Pigs: Washington's First Military Defeat in the Americas. Pathfinder  
Franqui, Carlos. 1984. Family Portrait with Fidel.  
Rodriguez, Juan Carlos. 1999. Bay of Pigs and the CIA. Ocean Press. 
Thomas, Hugh. 1998. Cuba: The Pursuit of Freedom. Da Capo Press. 
Almeida Lives Today More Than Ever by Fidel Castro, Monthly Review, September 13, 2009

1927 births
2009 deaths
People from Havana
Cuban communists
Cuban soldiers
Communist Party of Cuba politicians
Cuban generals
Cuban revolutionaries
Government ministers of Cuba
People of the Cuban Revolution
University of Havana alumni
20th-century Cuban military personnel